The 1747 British general election returned members to serve in the House of Commons of the 10th Parliament of Great Britain to be summoned, after the merger of the Parliament of England and the Parliament of Scotland in 1707. The election saw Henry Pelham's Whig government increase its majority and the Tories continue their decline. By 1747, thirty years of Whig oligarchy and systematic corruption had weakened party ties substantially; despite that Walpole, the main reason for the split that led to the creation of the Patriot Whig faction, had resigned, there were still almost as many Whigs in opposition to the ministry as there were Tories, and the real struggle for power was between various feuding factions of Whig aristocrats rather than between the old parties. The Tories had effectively become an irrelevant group of country gentlemen who had resigned themselves to permanent opposition.

Summary of the constituencies
See 1796 British general election for details. The constituencies used were the same throughout the existence of the Parliament of Great Britain.

Dates of election
The general election was held between 26 June 1747 and 4 August 1747.

At this period elections did not take place at the same time in every constituency. The returning officer in each county or parliamentary borough fixed the precise date (see hustings for details of the conduct of the elections).

Results

Seats summary

See also
List of parliaments of Great Britain

References
 British Electoral Facts 1832–1999, compiled and edited by Colin Rallings and Michael Thrasher (Ashgate Publishing Ltd 2000). (For dates of elections before 1832, see the footnote to Table 5.02).

1747 in politics
General election
1747